Costin Pavăl (born 1 September 1990 in Bucharest) is a Romanian tennis player.

Pavăl has a career high ATP singles ranking of 722 achieved on 9 June 2014. He also has a career high ATP doubles ranking of 138 achieved on 3 August 2015.

Pavăl won his first ATP Challenger Tour doubles title at the 2014 Internazionali di Tennis Castel del Monte, partnering Patrick Grigoriu, defeating Roman Jebavý and Andreas Siljeström in the final, 7–6(7–4), 6–7(4–7), [10–5].

External links

Oklahoma Sooners profile

1990 births
Living people
Romanian male tennis players
Tennis players from Bucharest
Tennis players from Miami
Oklahoma Sooners men's tennis players
21st-century Romanian people